Lethe latiaris , the pale forester, is a species of Satyrinae butterfly found in the  Indomalayan realm

Subspecies
 L. l. latiaris Sikkim - Assam, Karens, Yunnan
L. l. perimela   Fruhstorfer, 1911   Burma, Thailand, Laos, Vietnam

Synonym
L. l. lishadii  Huang, 2002   S E Tibet was synonymized for nominate race by Yoshino 2022

L. unistigma  Lee, 1996     Yunnan was synonymized for nominate race by Yoshino 2022

References
  2022: Descriptions of new subspecies of Delias lativitta, Melitaea agar, and Issoria altissima from China and changes in the status of the genera Aporia and Lethe from China and Vietnam. Butterfly Science 22:78 - 91

latiaris
Butterflies of Asia
Butterflies of Indochina